Menzgold Ghana Limited was a fraudulent gold dealership and investment firm that promised customers an average of 7-10 percent monthly returns on investments. It was subsequently shut down by the Government of Ghana. It was founded by Nana Appiah Mensah. The firm is reported to have initially traded as Menzbank; then changed to Menzbanc and then finally to Menzgold, due to warnings from the Bank of Ghana about the use of 'bank' as a company name for a non-banking entity.

Controversy 
Its operations were shut down in September 2018 by the Ghana Securities and Exchange Commission. The company's operating license which had initially been granted in 2014, was revoked by the Minerals Commission of Ghana had primarily been for gold trading and export. However, as reports of a gold-investment scheme with high returns started to circulate, the Bank of Ghana begun to publish warnings which cautioned citizens to be wary of dealing with the firm and warned the firm against taking cash deposits.

Customers deposit at Menzgold have been locked out since the shutdown and can't access their investments, leading to demonstrations at its various branches. In January 2019, the Economic and Organised Crime Office of Ghana, secured a court order to freeze all landed properties and vehicles belonging to the embattled Chief Executive Office of Menzgold Ghana Limited, Nana Appiah Mensah. The landed properties include Menzgold Ghana Limited, Menzgold Office Complex, Zylofon Art Complex, Brew Marketing Consult, Star Mad. Football Club, Zylofon Music and Media Company Limited, Brew Energy Company Limited and G. Tech Automobile Service. Nana Appiah Mensah who later went to Dubai to claim some of his money to pay his customers was arrested and sued by a Dubai based company called Horizon Royal Diamond. He won the case and was released which the court ordered an amount of $39 million to be paid to him. He returned to Ghana and was arrested by the Ghana Police and later released on bail of 1 billion Ghana Cedis. Nana Appiah Mensah is now preparing a payment schedule for his customers.

On Wednesday, January 8 2020 some aggrieved customers of Menzgold Ghana Limited massed up at the residence of Nana Appiah Mensah to discuss payments of their locked up funds. Nana Appiah Mensah fired shots to ward off his angry customers.

References

Financial services companies of Ghana
Ghanaian companies established in 2014